Yours For Mine is an American hardcore band, mixing multiple genres of music including melodic metalcore, indie rock, post-hardcore, and Christian hardcore. They formed in Harrisonburg, Virginia and started making music in 2006, disbanded in the winter of 2009, but later reunited. The band released a studio album, Dear Children, in 2008 on Blood and Ink Records, and then released their follow-up album, Yours For Mine: How Dark the Night, thirteen years later in early 2021.

Members
Current members
 Chad Altenberger
 Joey Testa
 Benjamin Cooley
 Stephen Minnick
 Jonathan Woods

Discography
Studio albums
 Dear Children (January 1, 2008, Blood and Ink)
Yours For Mine: How Dark the Night (March 19, 2021, Self-Released)

References

External links
 

Musical groups from Virginia
2006 establishments in Virginia
2009 disestablishments in Virginia
Musical groups established in 2006
Musical groups disestablished in 2009
Blood and Ink Records artists